The Judge Building (also known as the Railway Exchange Building), is a historic commercial building in Salt Lake City, Utah, United States, that is listed on the National Register of Historic Places (NRHP).



Description
The 7-story commercial office building was designed by David C. Dent and constructed for Mary Judge in 1907. The facade features masonry piers capped by terracotta floral designs and canine heads segmenting a sixth floor lintel. Circles with inverted triangles decorate the parapet below a copper, denticulated cornice. The Judge Building was added to the National Register of Historic Places in 1979.

Seven railway companies leased space in the building prior to its completion, and the number later increased to 22 railway companies. When the building opened in 1908, almost all office space already was rented.

The Bombing:

In October of 1985, stockbroker, Steven Christensen, 31 years old, had just arrived at his office in the Judge Building shortly after 8 A.M. when a box bearing his name and lying in a corridor exploded, killing him instantly, the police said. This incident was featured in the 2021 Netflix documentary series Murder Among the Mormons.

Mary Judge
Mary (Harney) Judge (April 19, 1841-November 8, 1909) was a real estate and mining investor based in Salt Lake City. Her husband, John Judge, had been a wealthy investor in the Daly Mine in Park City, later incorporated as Utah's Silver King Mine. After her husband's death in 1892, Mary judge became well known in business and in philanthropy.

See also

 National Register of Historic Places listings in Salt Lake City
 Judge Memorial Catholic High School

References

Further reading
 Allan Kent Powell, Judge, John and Mary Harney, Utah History Encyclopedia
 Mike Gorrell, Judge Building Is Sold, The Salt Lake Tribune, June 28, 2007

External links

		

National Register of Historic Places in Salt Lake City
Early Commercial architecture in the United States
Buildings and structures completed in 1907